Kuih kosui, also known as kuih lompang, is a traditional Malaysian kuih from Peranakan cuisine. The kuih is a steamed rice cake made with tapioca flour and rice flour flavored with palm sugar and pandan, and eaten with grated coconut. It bears resemblance to the Burmese mont kywe the and Filipino kutsinta.

References

See also 

 Kuih
 Mont kywe the, a similar Burmese dish
 Kutsinta, a similar Filipino dish

Malaysian cuisine
Steamed foods
Rice cakes